K. B. Fletcher Mill is a historic grist mill located at East New Market, Dorchester County, Maryland.  It was constructed in the 1850s, originally as a two-story, gable-roofed structure.  Around 1900 a third floor was added to the main structure and a gable-roofed addition was built. The mill retains a wide variety of milling equipment dating from the 1850s to the early 20th century.

It was listed on the National Register of Historic Places in 1978.

References

External links
, including photo from 1975, at Maryland Historical Trust

Grinding mills in Maryland
Buildings and structures in Dorchester County, Maryland
National Register of Historic Places in Dorchester County, Maryland
Grinding mills on the National Register of Historic Places in Maryland